Estonia competed at the 2013 World Aquatics Championships in Barcelona, Spain from 19 July to 4 August 2013.

Swimming

Estonian swimmers achieved qualifying standards in the following events (up to a maximum of 2 swimmers in each event at the A-standard entry time, and 1 at the B-standard):

Men

Women

References

External links
Barcelona 2013 Official Site
Eesti Ujumisliit web site

Nations at the 2013 World Aquatics Championships
World Aquatics Championships
Estonia at the World Aquatics Championships